Michael Andrew Kircher (September 30, 1897 – June 26, 1972) was an American Major League Baseball pitcher.

References

Major League Baseball pitchers
Philadelphia Athletics players
Baseball players from New York (state)
1897 births
1972 deaths
Sportspeople from Rochester, New York